The 838th Air Division is an inactive United States Air Force organization.  Its last assignment was with Tactical Air Command, assigned to Twelfth Air Force at Forbes Air Force Base, Kansas.  It was inactivated on 24 December 1969.

The division was first activated in the fall of 1957 at Ardmore Air Force Base, where the 463d Troop Carrier Wing and 419th Troop Carrier Group were stationed.  However, the 419th, which was flying Fairchild C-123 Providers, was inactivated in December, rather than upgrading to a wing and the 838th was inactivated along with it.

History

Ardmore Air Force Base

The 838th Air Division was first activated on 25 September 1957 at Ardmore Air Force Base, Oklahoma in anticipation that the 419th Troop Carrier Group would be expanded to a wing, joining the 463d Troop Carrier Wing at Ardmore.  The division's 838th Air Base Group assumed the management of the base from the 463d Air Base Group, which was inactivated upon transferring its resources.  However, the 463d Wing was converting from the Fairchild C-123 Provider to become the Air Force's first Lockheed C-130 Hercules wing and it was decided to inactivate the 419th and its Providers before the end of the year, along with the new division. The division commander, Col James L. Daniel Jr., had been the commander of the 463d wing before the division was activated and returned to that command when the division and 419th Group were inactivated on 11 December 1957. The 838th Air Base Group was reassigned to the 463d Wing and remained the base host unit.

Pope and Forbes Air Force Bases

The division was reactivated at Pope Air Force Base in July 1963 and was assigned the 464th Troop Carrier Wing, a C-123 wing stationed there.  In October the 463d Troop Carrier Wing, which had recently moved to Langley Air Force Base, Virginia was again assigned to the 838th.  Both wings performed worldwide tactical airlift and participated in tactical exercises and operations. Its 463d Wing supported forces deploying in response to the Gulf of Tonkin incident in Operation One Buck beginning shortly after the incident in August 1964. The 464th Wing conducted combat crew training until April 1964 and kept two of its squadrons deployed overseas for most of the period it was assigned.  It was awarded the MacKay Trophy in 1964 for Operation Dragon Rouge, the humanitarian airlift of over 1500 refugees from the Republic of the Congo in an operation that continued after it was reassigned to another division. It also received an Air Force Outstanding Unit Award for the actions of its elements deployed to Vietnam performing combat airlift missions. The 464th had sent two squadrons of Providers to South Vietnam during 1962 in Operation Mule Train and Operation Ranch Hand. The crews and planes operated as provisional units there. These planes were joined by a third squadron in 1963, although all were eventually transferred to regular Pacific Air Forces units of the 315th Troop Carrier Group.

In November 1964, the division moved from Pope to Forbes Air Force Base, Kansas.  The 463d and 464th Wings were relieved from assignment to the division and the 313th Troop Carrier Wing at Forbes and the 516th Troop Carrier Wing at Dyess Air Force Base, Texas were transferred to the 838th's command Until the division inactivated its wings frequently deployed aircraft and personnel to Europe, the Far East, and the Panama Canal Zone.

In August 1969, the 516th Wing began training aircrews on the de Havilland Canada C-7 Caribou.  The 838th was inactivated in December 1969 and its units were reassigned directly to Twelfth Air Force.

Lineage
 Established as the 838 Air Division on 30 August 1957
 Activated on 25 September 1957
 Inactivated on 11 December 1957
 Activated on 13 June 1963 (not organized)
 Organized on 1 July 1963
 Inactivated on 24 December 1969

Assignments
 Ninth Air Force, 25 September – 11 December 1957
 Tactical Air Command, 13 June 1963 (not organized)
 Twelfth Air Force, 1 July 1963 – 24 December 1969

Stations
 Ardmore Air Force Base, Oklahoma, 25 September – 11 December 1957
 Pope Air Force Base, North Carolina, 1 July 1963
 Forbes Air Force Base, Kansas, 9 November 1964 – 24 December 1969

Components
Wings
 313th Troop Carrier Wing (later 313 Tactical Airlift Wing): 9 November 1964 – 24 December 1969
 463d Troop Carrier Wing: 25 September – 11 December 1957; 1 October 1963 – 9 November 1964
 Langley Air Force Base, Virginia, 1963–1964
 464th Troop Carrier Wing: 1 July 1963 – 9 November 1964
 516th Troop Carrier Wing (later 516 Tactical Airlift Wing): 9 November 1964 – 24 December 1969
 Dyess Air Force Base, Texas

Groups
 419th Troop Carrier Group: 25 September – 11 December 1957
 838th Air Base Group: 25 September – 11 December 1957
 930th Tactical Airlift Group: 13 May – 1 June 1968
 Bakalar Air Force Base, Indiana

Aircraft

 Fairchild C-123 Provider, 1957, 1963–1964
 Lockheed C-130 Hercules, 1957, 1963–1969
 de Havilland Canada C-7 Caribou, 1969

Commanders

 Col James L. Daniel Jr., 25 September – 11 December 1957
 Brig Gen William T. Daly, 1 July 1963
 Brig Gen Ernest C. Hardin Jr., c. 7 August 1964
 Brig Gen Burl W. McLaughlin, c. January 1965
 Brig Gen Joseph N. Donovan, c. 22 March 1966
 Col William G. Duncan, c. June 1967
 Col Clarence B. Slaughter, c. 1 June – 24 November 1969

See also
 List of Lockheed C-130 Hercules operators
 List of United States Air Force air divisions

References

Notes

Citations

Bibliography

 
 

 Further reading

External links
 
 

1957 establishments in Oklahoma
Air divisions of the United States Air Force
Military units and formations of the United States in the Cold War